Mohammadabad (also Romanized as Moḩammadābād) is a village in Miyan Velayat Rural District, in the Central District of Mashhad County, Razavi Khorasan Province, Iran. At the 2006 census, its population was 63, in 16 families.

Climate

References 

Populated places in Mashhad County